Assaf is both a masculine given name and a surname. This spelling in English represents two unrelated names, Hebrew אָסָף‎ /(ʔ)aˈsaf/ and Arabic عَسَاف /ʕa.saːf/, both of which can be used as given names and surnames. Notable people with the name include:

Dynasty
 Assaf dynasty, the Turkmen rulers in Mount Lebanon during Mamluk and Ottoman era

People with the given name
 Assaf Amdursky (born 1971), Israeli singer and producer
 Assaf Azo (born 1984), Israeli footballer
 Assaf Bernstein (born 1970), Israeli film writer, director, and producer
 Assaf Cohen (born 1972), American actor
 Assaf Gavron (born 1968), Israeli writer, novelist, translator and musician
 Assaf HaRofeh, Hebrew medical writer known as Asaph the Jew
 Assaf Hefetz (born 1944), commissioner of the Israeli Police
 Assaf Inbari (born 1968), Israeli writer, novelist, and journalist
 Assaf Kehati (born 1979), Israeli jazz guitarist, composer, bandleader and educator based in Boston
 Assaf Khalifa (born 1968), Syrian football player
 Assaf Kidron (born 1976), Israeli sculptor
 Assaf Kraus, member of the Israeli indie pop-rock band missFlag
 Assaf Lowengart (born 1998), Israeli baseball player on Team Israel
 Assaf Naor (born 1975), Czech-Israeli mathematician, computer scientist, and professor
 Assaf Abu Rahhal (1955–2010), Lebanese journalist
 Assaf Al-Qarni (born 1984), Saudi Arabian football goalkeeper
 Assaf Ramon (c. 1987/1988 – 2009), Israeli pilot
 Assaf Schuster, Israeli professor of computer science
 Assaf Shaham (born 1983), Israeli artist
 Assaf Shelleg, Israeli-American musicologist and pianist
 Assaf Yaguri (1931–2000), Israeli soldier and politician

People with the surname
 Ami Assaf (1903–1963), Israeli politician
 Joseph Assaf (born 1944), Australian businessman
 Mikhayl Assaf (1887–1970), archbishop of the Melkite Greek Catholic Church
 Mohammad Assaf (born 1989), Palestinian pop singer
 Rima Assaf (born 1970), Lebanese journalist and anchor
 Roger Assaf, Lebanese playwright
 Roy Assaf (actor) (born 1979), Israeli actor
 Roy Assaf (choreographer) (born 1982), Israeli choreographer
 Roy Assaf (musician) (born 1982), Israeli jazz pianist and composer based in New York
 Samir Assaf (born 1960), Lebanese businessman and chief executive officer of HSBC Global Banking & Markets
 Woodie Assaf (1917−2009), American weatherman
 Ibrahim Abdulaziz Al-Assaf (born 1949), Minister of State and Former Finance Minister And Forign Minister of Saudi Arabia.

See also
 Assef
Asaf
Asif

Masculine given names